The County of Ravensberg was a historical county of the Holy Roman Empire. Its territory was in present-day eastern Westphalia, Germany at the foot of the Osning or Teutoburg Forest.

History 

 
Ravensberg was first mentioned in the 12th century; its first seat was Ravensberg Castle. The Counts of Ravensberg then had Sparrenberg Castle built in Bielefeld , which they made their seat. They also owned Limberg Castle near .

The county was later inherited by the Duchy of Berg in 1346, which in turn became part of the Duchy of Jülich-Berg in 1423, and ultimately the United Duchies of Jülich-Cleves-Berg in 1521.

After the War of the Jülich succession, in the Treaty of Xanten in 1614, the County of Ravensberg came to the Margraviate of Brandenburg, which became the Kingdom of Prussia in 1701, and was administered within Minden-Ravensberg from 1719–1807, when it was dissolved during the Napoleonic Wars.

Aside from Bielefeld, other communities in the County of Ravensberg were Borgholzhausen, Halle, Steinhagen, Versmold, Werther, Isselhorst (now part of Gütersloh), Enger, Hiddenhausen, Rödinghausen, Spenge, Herford (except for Falkendiek), Bünde (except for Dünne and Spradow), Vlotho (except for Uffeln), Kirchlengern south of the Werre, Preußisch Oldendorf (except for Hedem and Lashorst) and Bad Oeynhausen south of the Werre.

Rulers

House Calvelage-Ravensberg 
Until 1144 Hermann I
c. 1140 – c. 1170 Otto I
c. 1160 – c. 1180 Heinrich
c. 1175 – c. 1220 Hermann II    
c. 1220 – 1244 Otto II
c. 1220 – 1249 Ludwig
1249–1306 Otto III
1306–1328 Otto IV
1328–1346 Bernard

House of Jülich 
1348–1395 in Personal union with Berg, since 1437 with Jülich-Berg
1346–1360 Gerhard I
1360–1408 William I, lets his 2 sons rule :
1395–1403 Adolf
1403–1428 William II
1428–1475 Gerhard II
1475–1511 William III

House of La Marck, Dukes 
from 1521 a part of the United Duchies of Jülich-Cleves-Berg
 1511–1539 John
 1539–1592 William V
 1592–1609 John William I

House of Hohenzollern 
from 1614 Margraves of Brandenburg and Kings of Prussia
 1614–1619 John Sigismund of Hohenzollern
 1619–1640 George William, son
 1640–1688 Frederick William I, son
 1688–1713 Frederick I, son, King in Prussia from 1701 
 1713–1740 Frederick William I, son, King in Prussia 
 1740–1786 Frederick II, son, King of Prussia from 1772
 1786–1797 Frederick William II, nephew, King of Prussia
 1797–1807 Frederick William III, King of Prussia
To France by the 1807 Treaty of Tilsit, incorporated into the Kingdom of Westphalia

See also  
 Ostwestfalen-Lippe

External links 
 
 Historical Map of Northrhine-Westphalia 1789

Borgholzhausen
1807 disestablishments in Germany
Ravensberg
Ravensberg
Former states and territories of North Rhine-Westphalia
States and territories established in the 1140s
Lower Rhenish-Westphalian Circle
Preußisch Oldendorf
1140s establishments in the Holy Roman Empire